King of the Bullwhip is a 1950 American Western film produced and directed by Ron Ormond starring Lash LaRue and Al "Fuzzy" St. John. It was the eighth of LaRue's films for Ormond's Western Adventures Productions Inc. The film was the second to be released by Howco, Ron Ormond's new film company composed of Ormond and drive-in movie owners Joy N. Houck and J. Francis White, and Ormond's first film as director. The  screenplay is co-written by Jack Lewis and Associate Producer Ira S. Webb. Jack Holt and Tom Neal return from the previous film but in different roles. The film was shot at the Iverson Movie Ranch.

Plot
US Marshal Lash and Deputy Marshal Fuzzy are sent to the stop a gang led by a bullwhip wielding masked bandit called El Azote who are terrorising the area through murder and armed robbery. Ambushed by a group of seven riders, Lash and Fuzzy evade them and make their way to Tioga City. Upon arrival in town Lash notices the local newspaper informed the town of the arrival of a marshal and deputy. This leads Lash to believe that someone at the newspaper let the news out as opposed to their usual clandestine arrival in order to kill them.

After a fight in a saloon where Lash uses his whip on a thug, he meets Benson, the owner of the saloon. Lash informs Benson that they were waylaid by a gang of men. Lash decides to allay suspicion of their true identities by telling Benson they saw the bodies of a Marshal and his deputy that they buried. Benson notices Lash's prowess with a bullwhip in the fight and schemes to dress Lash as El Azote to reap profits and give El Azote the blame. Lash agrees as he feel this will get him closer to the identity of El Azote.

Eventually Lash and Fuzzy's true identities as lawmen are discovered; they are captured, disarmed and tied up. Escaping their bonds by using their spurs, Lash and Fuzzy bring El Azote and his outlaw gang to justice; Lash using his whip, Fuzzy using his slingshot. The film features two climaxes. Lash and El Azote have a bullwhip fight to the finish whilst Fuzzy, who constantly regales all and sundry of his imaginary friendship and adventures with Buffalo Bill comes to face with the real Bill Cody...

Cast 
Lash La Rue 	... 	Marshal Lash La Rue
Al St. John ... Deputy Fuzzy Q. Jones
Jack Holt ... 	James Kerrigan
Tom Neal... 	Benson
Dennis Moore 	... 	Joe Chester
Anne Gwynne 	... 	Jane Kerrigan
George J. Lewis 	... 	Rio 
Michael Whalen 	... 	Thurman 
 Mary Lou Webb 	... 	Mary Lou the Saloon Girl
 Willis Houck 	... 	Willis
 Cliff Taylor 	... 	Mr. Palmer
 Frank Jaquet 	... 	Joe the Bartender
 Tex Cooper 	... 	Buffalo Bill

Production
US Marine, Western movie fan and aspiring screenwriter Jack Lewis had met Lash Larue and suggested he had an idea for a screenplay for him. Larue told Lewis he had a new producer, Ron Ormond and to contact him. By chance Lewis had also met Al St. John when his motorcycle needed repair outside his farm. Ormond agreed to use the screenplay but advised Lewis to not give Larue any lines over ten words and to let St. John write his own comedy.

The film was shot in five days for $40,000 with the climatic bullwhip duel filmed in one afternoon. King of the Bullwhip also used several sequences of action and chase footage from previous Ormond Larue films. By the time the film was released Lewis was back in the Marine Corps en route to the Korean War. Ormond offered Lewis screenplay credits on other of their films to keep his name active whilst he was in Korea, but Lewis turned the offer down.

In addition to Ormond's father in law Cliff Taylor appearing in the film, Joy Houck's son Willis and Ira Webb's daughter Mary Lou make appearances.

Buffalo Bill was portrayed by Judge Thomas "Tex" Cooper (1876-1951) who knew Buffalo Bill, had performed in the Wild West Shows at the World's Columbian Exposition and the 101 Ranch Wild West Show and was an actual Sherman, Texas sheriff.

In Italy the film was known as Le Pistole Di Zorro

Release 
The film released in theaters December 20, 1950 in the United States.

The film was available as a manufactured on demand DVD from Turner Classic Movies. A new 2K scan and limited run Blu-ray release is set for 2022 by Canadian independent distributor, Gold Ninja Video.

References

External links

1950 films
American Western (genre) films
1950 Western (genre) films
1950 directorial debut films
American black-and-white films
Films directed by Ron Ormond
1950s English-language films
1950s American films